Mass Rapid Transit in general refers to a fully grade separated heavy-rail metro system.

The term may also specifically refer to:
 Chennai Mass Rapid Transit System, a rapid transit system in Chennai, India
 Jakarta Mass Rapid Transit, a rapid transit system in Jakarta, Indonesia
 Kaohsiung Mass Rapid Transit or Kaohsiung Metro, a rapid transit and light rail system in Kaohsiung, Taiwan
 Mass Rapid Transit Authority of Thailand, a government agency responsible for overseeing the operation of rapid transit systems in Thailand
 Mass Rapid Transit (Bangkok) or Metropolitan Rapid Transit, Thailand
 Mass Rapid Transit (Malaysia), a rapid transit system in Greater Kuala Lumpur and Johor Bahru, Malaysia
 Mass Rapid Transit Corporation (Malaysia), the developer and asset owner of the Mass Rapid Transit project
 Mass Rapid Transit (Singapore), a rapid transit system in Singapore
 Taichung Mass Rapid Transit or Taichung Metro, a rapid transit system in Taichung, Taiwan
 Taipei Mass Rapid Transit or Taipei Metro, a rapid transit system in Taipei, Taiwan
 Taoyuan Mass Rapid Transit System or Taoyuan Metro, a rapid transit system in Taoyuan, Taiwan

See also 
 MRT (disambiguation)
 Rapid transit (disambiguation)